Sin Du-ho (born 13 October 1934) is a South Korean fencer. He competed in the individual and team foil and épée events at the 1964 Summer Olympics.

References

External links
 

1934 births
Living people
South Korean male foil fencers
Olympic fencers of South Korea
Fencers at the 1964 Summer Olympics
Hankuk University of Foreign Studies alumni
People from Cheongju
South Korean male épée fencers
Sportspeople from North Chungcheong Province